"Kuchizuke" is Fayray's 18th single. It was released on October 13, 2004 and peaked at #26. The song was used as theme song for the Tōkai TV/Fuji TV series Soap opera "Ai no Solea". The first coupling is a cover of Fleetwood Mac's "Landslide".

Track listing
口づけ (Kuchizuke; Kiss)
Landslide
Someday
Someday (Jazz version)

Charts 
"Kuchizuke" - Oricon Sales Chart (Japan)

2004 singles
Fayray songs
Japanese television drama theme songs
2004 songs
Songs written by Fayray